The 2012–13 Munster Rugby season was Munster's twelfth season competing in the Pro12, alongside which they also competed in the Heineken Cup. It was Rob Penney's first season as head coach.

Summary

Munster were drawn in pool 1 for the 2012–13 Heineken Cup, alongside Scottish Pro12 rivals and semi-finals of the previous seasons competition Edinburgh, English Premiership side Saracens and French Top 14 side Racing Métro 92. Hew head coach Rob Penney appointed Doug Howlett as the new squad captain ahead of the 2012–13 season. Munster opened their Heineken Cup campaign with a 22–17 away defeat against Racing Métro 92 on 13 October 2012. 8 days later, Munster won 33–0 in their round 2 home fixture against Edinburgh. In the December back-to-backs against Saracens in rounds 3 and 4, Munster won 15–9 at home, before being defeated 19–13 away. Munster won 26–17 away from home against Edinburgh on 13 January 2013. One week later, Munster beat Racing Métro 92 29–6 at home to secure the second 'best runner-up' spot and advance to the tournament knockout stage. In their quarter-final against English team Harlequins on 7 April 2013, Munster produced an immense performance, captained by Paul O'Connell in the absence of Doug Howlett, to win 18–12 away from home. In the semi-final on 27 April 2018, Munster were beaten 16–10 by French side Clermont, despite a gallant effort in the second half in the Stade de la Mosson. The match turned out to by club legend Ronan O'Gara's final appearance for Munster, as he announced his retirement from rugby a few weeks later. Squad captain and another club legend, Doug Howlett, was forced to retire after a shoulder injury suffered against Glasgow Warriors in March 2013. Munster finished 6th in the 2012–13 Pro12 regular season with 11 wins, 10 defeats and 1 draw, missing out on the play-offs.

2012–13 Playing Squad

Players In
 Sean Dougall from  Rotherham Titans
 James Downey from  Northampton Saints
 Casey Laulala from  Cardiff Blues
 CJ Stander from  Blue Bulls / Bulls
 Christy Condon from  Dolphin
 Barry O'Mahony from  Clontarf
 Alan Cotter promoted from Academy
 JJ Hanrahan promoted from Academy
 Luke O'Dea promoted from Academy
 Dave O'Callaghan promoted from Academy
 Cathal Sheridan promoted from Academy

Players Out
 Lifeimi Mafi to  Perpignan
 Tomás O'Leary to  London Irish
 Denis Fogarty to  Aurillac
 Jerry Flannery retired
 Mick O'Driscoll retired
 Denis Leamy retired
 David Wallace retired
 John Hayes retired
 Darragh Hurley retired
 Tom Gleeson released
 Declan Cusack released
 Peter Borlase released

Pre-season

2012–13 Pro12

2012–13 Heineken Cup

Pool 1

Quarter-final

Semi-final

References

External links
2012–13 Munster Rugby season official site

2012–13
2012–13 Pro12 by team
2012–13 in Irish rugby union
2012–13 Heineken Cup by team